Fengtian (postal: Fengtien; Manchu: Abkai imiyangga fu) is:

 Shenyang, largest city and provincial capital of Liaoning province, which was formerly administered under Fengtian Fu, which was abolished in 1910
 Liaoning, the province formerly named Fengtian from 1907 to 1929; under the Manchukuo regime, the name was revived, but again abolished in 1945.
 Fengtian clique, a group of warlord factions during the Republic of China's warlord era
 Fengtian Temple, Mazu temple in Xingang, Chiayi County, Taiwan
 Fengtian, Jiangxi (枫田镇), a town in Anfu County, Jiangxi
 Fengtian, Inner Mongolia (丰田镇), a town in Tongliao City, Inner Mongolia
 Fengtian, Fujian (丰田镇), a town in Nanjing County, Fujian
 Fengtian, Xinning (丰田乡), a township of Xinning County, Hunan